"Afro Puffs" is the first single released by the Lady of Rage in 1994 from the Death Row labeled Above the Rim: The Soundtrack. The extended, video, and instrumental version on the single samples "Superman Lover" (Intro) by Johnny "Guitar" Watson. The original song samples "Love That Will Not Die", also by Johnny "Guitar" Watson. The term that the title refers to is a hairstyle in which the hair is tied into ball-shaped masses at the top or sides of the head. The song is featured in the 2013 video game Grand Theft Auto Vs 2014 "enhanced edition" re-release.  The song was performed live at the 1995 Source Awards, as well as at the 2008 BET Hip Hop Awards.

Track listing
 Radio version
 Extended version (featuring Dr. Dre)
 G-Funk mix
 LP version
 Instrumental

Charts

Popular culture
In popular media, comedian Tiffany Haddish performed the song during Lip Sync Battle on The Tonight Show with Jimmy Fallon.

References

External links 
 Thug Radio
 Lil Kim remake Information

1994 singles
1994 songs
G-funk songs
Snoop Dogg songs
Song recordings produced by Dr. Dre
Songs written by Daz Dillinger